Finding Beauty in Chaos is the debut album by alternative rock supergroup Beauty in Chaos. The album was released on September 28, 2018. The project was created by Michael Ciravolo of Human Drama and Gene Loves Jezebel, who writes on every track excluding cover track 4. Most of the album is composed of industrial and gothic bands, with various other genres also being featured on the album. Most of the album was recorded and mixed in Ciravolo's own SAINTinLA Studio which is based in Sun Valley, Los Angeles by producer Michael Rozon.

The release features various notable musicians, including Al Jourgensen (Ministry), Simon Gallup (The Cure), Ashton Nyte (The Awakening), Michael Aston (Gene Loves Jezebel), Robin Zander (Cheap Trick), Michael Anthony (Van Halen), Ice T (Body Count), dUg Pinnick (King's X), and Wayne Hussey (The Mission).

A follow up remix album titled Beauty Re-envisioned will be released in March 2019.

Reception 

Aaron Badgley of The Spill Magazine gave the album a very positive rating of 4.5/5. Aaron elaborates further on the album below.

Track listing 

 Road to Rosario - 4:36 (Aston / Ciravolo)
 Storm - 6:12 (Nyte / Ciravolo)
 Man of Faith - 4:33 (Hussey / Ciravolor)
 20th Century Boy - 4:35 (Performed by Al Jourgensen/ Written by Marc Bolan)
 Drifting Away -  4:49 (Zander, Ciravolo, Christian, Matchinga)
 Memory of Love - 4:18 (Indovina / Ciravolo)
 Look Up - 5:28 (Ciravolo)
 Un-Natural Disaster - 5:29 (Pinnick / Ice-T / Ciravolo)
 The Long Goodbye - 5:03 (Hussey / Ciravolo)
 Beauty Lies Within - 6:36 (Indovina / Ciravolo)
 Bloodless and Fragile - 8:10 (Nyte / Ciravolo)
 I Will Follow You - 6:59 (Vine / Ciravolo)
 Heliotrope - 5:16 (Martin / Ciravolo)
 Finding Beauty In Chaos - 7:14 (Nyte / Ciravolo)

References

External links 
 Official website
 Bandcamp 

2018 debut albums